Stierlin is a surname. Notable people with the surname include:

 Helm Stierlin (1926–2021), German psychiatrist, psychoanalyst, and systemic family therapist
 Henri Stierlin (1928–2022), Swiss journalist and writer
 Niclas Stierlin (born 2000), German footballer